Arthur Taylor may refer to:

 Arthur Taylor (1790–1870), English writer, son of hymn writer John Taylor
 Arthur H. Taylor (1852–1922), U.S. Representative from Indiana
 Arthur Taylor (cricketer) (1883–1956), English cricketer
 Montana Taylor (Arthur Taylor, 1903–c. 1958), American boogie-woogie pianist
 Arthur Howard Taylor (1905–1982), U.S. Navy officer who commanded USS Haddock (SS-231) during World War II
 Tag Taylor (1925–2014), (Sir (Arthur) Godfrey Taylor, born 1925), British local government leader
 Art Taylor (1929–1995), American jazz drummer
 Arthur R. Taylor (1935–2015), American businessman
 Archie Taylor (footballer, born 1939) (Arthur Matson Taylor), English former footballer
 Arthur William Taylor (born 1956), New Zealand prison inmate who has initiated Corrections Department and legislature reforms from prison

See also
 Arthur Taylor House (disambiguation)